The 2014 Tuvalu A-Division was the 14th season of top flight association football in Tuvalu. The season started on 22 February 2014 and finished on 8 April 2014.

Clubs

Standings

Round 1

Round 2

Round 3

Round 4

Round 5

Round 6

Round 7

References

External links 
 tnfa.tv
 vriendenvantuvalu.nl 
 soccerway.com

Tuvalu A-Division seasons
1
Tuvalu